Gavin Victor Holligan (born 30 June 1980) is an English former footballer and musician.

Football career
Holligan turned down a university scholarship to study music in order to play football. He started his footballing career with Walton and Hersham in August 1997 and at one stage had 18 of 20 Premier League teams representatives watching him play. Having impressed in non-league football he made a £150,000 move from Conference side Kingstonian to the Premiership with West Ham United in November 1998. However, he failed to break into the first team, making just one appearance in the 2–2 draw with Liverpool at Anfield in February 1999 coming on as a late substitute for Joe Cole. Subsequent loan spells with Leyton Orient and Exeter City and a return to Kingstonian failed to reignite his career and he was released by West Ham in 2001. After a trial he had impressed manager Lawrie Sanchez and was signed by  Wycombe Wanderers and played there for three seasons until he was released by new Wycombe manager Tony Adams. 
He also had spells with Crawley Town, Hornchurch, and Havant & Waterlooville.

Music career
In 2006 a severe thigh injury ended Holligan's football career and he moved into the music industry. He is an autodidact pianist, session musician, singer-songwriter, producer and entrepreneur.

References

External links

Gavin Holligan at kingstonian.net

1980 births
Living people
Footballers from Lambeth
English footballers
Association football forwards
Walton & Hersham F.C. players
Kingstonian F.C. players
West Ham United F.C. players
Leyton Orient F.C. players
Exeter City F.C. players
Wycombe Wanderers F.C. players
Crawley Town F.C. players
Hornchurch F.C. players
Havant & Waterlooville F.C. players
Lewes F.C. players
National League (English football) players
Premier League players
English Football League players
Black British sportspeople
21st-century Black British male singers